Wampee is an unincorporated community in Horry County, South Carolina, United States, along South Carolina Highway 90. Wampee is located near North Myrtle Beach across from the Intracoastal Waterway. Robert Edge Parkway starts here.

Unincorporated communities in South Carolina
Unincorporated communities in Horry County, South Carolina